Tochukwu Oluehi (born 2 May 1987) is a Nigerian footballer, who plays as a goalkeeper for LHakkarigücü Spor, and the Nigeria women's national team.

Club career 
Oluehi played for Bobruichanka Bobruisk in the 2013–14 UEFA Women's Champions League. In April 2016, Oluehi and compatriot Cecilia Nku left Rivers Angels to join Norwegian Toppserien club Medkila IL. She played 21 games for Medkila, before returned to Rivers Angels and is since 2017 the Team captain, of the Angels.

In September 2022, she moved to Turkey and joined Hakkarigücü Spor to play in the 2022–23  Super League.

International career 
She also played three times an FIFA Women's World Cup and one time the Summer Olympic Games for the Nigeria women's national football team.

References

External links 
 
 

1987 births
Living people
Nigerian women's footballers
Nigeria women's international footballers
2007 FIFA Women's World Cup players
Olympic footballers of Nigeria
Footballers at the 2008 Summer Olympics
Women's association football goalkeepers
2011 FIFA Women's World Cup players
Toppserien players
Medkila IL (women) players
Expatriate women's footballers in Norway
Expatriate women's footballers in Belarus
Nigerian expatriate footballers
Nigerian expatriate sportspeople in Norway
Nigerian expatriate sportspeople in Belarus
2019 FIFA Women's World Cup players
Bayelsa Queens F.C. players
Sunshine Queens F.C. players
Rivers Angels F.C. players
Bobruichanka Bobruisk players
Igbo sportspeople
Nigerian expatriate sportspeople in Turkey
Expatriate women's footballers in Turkey
Turkish Women's Football Super League players
Hakkarigücü Spor players